Mount Stephens, prominence 1047m, also known as Quay, Kwe or k'we in Kwak'wala, is a mountain in the Pacific Ranges of the Coast Mountains in British Columbia, Canada, located in the Central Coast region, northeast of Nimmo Bay and Mackenzie Sound and west of Kingcome Inlet.

As K'we, Mount Stephens was the home of the thunderbird to the Gwawaenuk, who when he descended from the mountain took human form and became the ancestor of that group of Kwakwaka'wakw, whose principal village is now at Hegams, i.e. Hopetown on Watson Island in the Broughton Archipelago, from which a view of this mountain can be seen and is featured in a woodcut by artist Walter Phillips.

Name origin
Mount Stephens was named by Captain Vancouver after Sir Philip Stephens.

See also
Mount Stephens (disambiguation)
Stephens (disambiguation)

References

Pacific Ranges
Central Coast of British Columbia
One-thousanders of British Columbia